The Sylhet Government Pilot High School is one of the fourth oldest schools in Bangladesh as well as one of the oldest in Indian Subcontinent. It is also the first established high school of what is now Bangladesh.  Founded in 1836, it is situated in the Kalighat area of Sylhet, on the bank of the Surma River.

Events during the twenty-first century
Sylhet Gov. Pilot High School won the national prize in 2003.

Sylhet Government Pilot High School celebrated its 175th anniversary in 2010 with a grand reunion on 20 and 21 January 2010 at the school campus.

Notable alumni
Alphabetically listed according to the last name.
  - scientist, electrical engineer
 Syed Mujtaba Ali - writer
 Arup Ratan Choudhury - dental surgeon
 Humayun Rashid Choudhury - Speaker of the National Parliament (1996–2001)
 Mahmudul Amin Choudhury - Chief Justice (2001–2002)
 Hasan Mashhud Chowdhury - Chief of Army Staff (2002-2005)
 Sadruddin Ahmed Chowdhury - professor and founding vice chancellor of SUST
 Sundari Mohan Das - medical doctor
 Shuvro Dev - Singer
 Faruk Rashid Chowdhury - Minister of State for Finance (1987–1991)
 Mohammed Farashuddin - Governor of Bangladesh Bank (1998–2001)
 Syed Manzoorul Islam - writer, winner of Ekhushe Award
 Badar Uddin Ahmed Kamran - Mayor of Sylhet City Corporation (2003–2013)
 Faruq Ahmed Choudhury - diplomat
 Ariful Haque Choudhury - Mayor of Sylhet City Corporation
 Khalil Ullah Khan - film actor
Abu Sayeed Ayyub - Philosopher
 Abdul Malik - National Professor of Bangladesh
 AK Abdul Momen - Foreign Minister
 Abul Maal Abdul Muhith - Minister of Finance (1982–1984 and 2009–2019)
 M. A. G. Osmani - Commander in Chief, Bangladesh Liberation Army, 1971
 Abu Nasr Waheed - educationist

References 

High schools in Bangladesh
1836 establishments in India
Schools in Sylhet District
Educational institutions established in 1836